Adam Michalski (born 24 December 1988) is a Polish volleyball player, playing in position middle blocker. Since the 2018/2019 season, he has played for SPS Chrobry Głogów.

References

External links
 PlusLiga profile
 Volleybox profile
 KS.Cuprum profile

1988 births
People from Tarnowskie Góry
Living people
Polish men's volleyball players